Clay Daniel Land (born March 24, 1960) is a United States district judge of the United States District Court for the Middle District of Georgia.

Education and law practice
Born in Shreveport, Louisiana, Land received a Bachelor of Business Administration from the University of Georgia in 1982 and a Juris Doctor from the University of Georgia Law School in 1985. He was in private practice in Columbus, Georgia, from 1985 to 2001.

Political career
Land served as a member of the Columbus City Council from 1993 to 1994. In 1994 he was elected to the Georgia State Senate as a Republican. He served three terms (6 years) representing District 16, the same seat previously held by his cousin Ted. J. Land from 1979 to 1991.

District court service
On September 21, 2001, President George W. Bush nominated Land to a seat on the United States District Court for the Middle District of Georgia vacated by J. Robert Elliott. Land was confirmed by the United States Senate on December 13, 2001, and received his commission on December 21, 2001. He served as Chief Judge from October 1, 2014 to June 30, 2020.

Notable case
Land was in the spotlight in late 2009 when he tried the case Rhodes v. Macdonald, in which Army physician Connie Rhodes attempted to secure a restraining order against her being deployed to Iraq on the argument that President Barack Obama was not born in the United States and was ineligible to serve as President. Land rejected the argument as frivolous. Within hours of Land's decision, the physician's attorney, Orly Taitz, told the news site Talking Points Memo that she felt Land's refusal to hear her case was an act of treason. Two days later, she filed a motion to stay Rhodes' deployment pending rehearing of the dismissal order. She repeated her treason allegations against Land and made several other intemperate statements, including claims that Land was aiding and abetting purported aspirations of "dictatorship" by Obama. Land rejected the motion as frivolous and ordered her to show cause why she should not be fined $10,000 for abuse of judicial process.

 After Rhodes asked for Taitz to be removed as her attorney, on October 13, 2009, Judge Land issued a scathing 40-page ruling sanctioning Taitz and imposed a monetary penalty of $20,000 under Rule 11 of the Federal Rules of Civil Procedure. Upon learning of Land's ruling, Taitz told Talking Points Memo that she would not pay the fine, calling it "intimidation".

Judge Land ruled to continue the incarceration of ICE detainees at the detention center in Irwin County, Georgia during the COVID-19 crisis. During the more than three month period, from the original filing to the day of the hearing, one inmate in a nearby facility had died from the disease. In his summation he indicated that he had "not heard anything terribly persuasive to change my mind."

References

Sources

1960 births
Living people
Republican Party Georgia (U.S. state) state senators
Georgia (U.S. state) city council members
Judges of the United States District Court for the Middle District of Georgia
United States district court judges appointed by George W. Bush
21st-century American judges
Politicians from Shreveport, Louisiana
People from Columbus, Georgia
University of Georgia alumni
University of Georgia School of Law alumni
Georgia (U.S. state) lawyers